The 2001 European Le Mans Series season was the only season for the IMSA European Le Mans Series.  It is a series for Le Mans Prototypes (LMP) and Grand Touring (GT) race cars divided into 4 classes: LMP900, LMP675, GTS, and GT.  It began 17 March 2001 and ended 6 October 2001 after 7 races.

The series came about following the expansion of Don Panoz's American Le Mans Series to include European rounds in 2000.  The ELMS become a separate series for 2001, although following the same IMSA and ACO rules that the ALMS followed, and even having shared events among the two series.  Like the Petit Le Mans for the ALMS, the 1000 km of Estoril was meant to be a unique event that would earn automatic entries to the 24 Hours of Le Mans for its winners. A lack of interest from the European racing community and competition from the FIA's series, meant that this would be the only season of ELMS.  Another planned series, known as Asian-Pacific Le Mans Series (APLMS) was planned to begin in late 2001, but never occurred.  The Le Mans Endurance Series was eventually renamed the European Le Mans Series in 2012.

Following the demise of the European Le Mans Series, the ACO would attempt to create another European-based sportscar series in 2003 with the more successful Le Mans Endurance Series.

History 
With the Automobile Club de l'Ouest (ACO) allowing Don Panoz to bring the rules and racing formulas of the 24 Hours of Le Mans to America with the creation of the Petit Le Mans in 1998, Don Panoz attempted to build up a series to be based around Petit Le Mans.  The aged IMSA sportscar series was taken over and became the new American Le Mans Series, and met with much success in 1999.  Following this success, Panoz attempting to bring sportscar racing back to Europe, which had lacked a major sportscar series since the demise of the World Sportscar Championship in 1992. This led to the 2000 American Le Mans Series season, which included two races in Europe as the Nürburgring and Silverstone Circuit, as well as a round in Australia.  These races would serve as a precursor to what would become the separate European Le Mans Series in 2001.

The European Le Mans Series was launched for 2001 with 5 races, including a premier 1000 km race at Estoril, which would be the European equivalent of the 1000 mile Petit Le Mans and earn automatic entries to the 24 Hours of Le Mans for each class winner.

To aid in the development of the ELMS, the 2001 season shared some races between both ALMS and ELMS.  The 12 Hours of Sebring and Petit Le Mans, normally ALMS races, were considered optional races for ELMS teams.  At the same time, the ELMS races at Donington Park and Jarama were considered optional for ALMS teams.  This allowed for the possibility of boosting the draw from international teams to either series.

Unfortunately the series was unable to earn much attention from European sportscar teams, especially since the final FIA Sportscar Championship and FIA GT Championship series used similar cars, but different rules which would require teams to modify their cars or buy new cars to comply with ELMS rules.  This means that the car count for the 2001 season was small.  For the ELMS events that included ALMS teams, very few teams actually bothered to make the trip across the Atlantic to participate in races that appeared to have very few serious competitors.  Of the ALMS teams that did race, nearly all were factory backed squads that had the money to spend on transporting their equipment to Europe.  Thus the entry lists for each race fell from 25 at the beginning of the season to a mere 14 at season's end, with some classes only having one or two competitors.

With a lack of involvement from teams, and less interest from the media due to the lack of teams, the European Le Mans Series was forced to fold following the 2001 season.

The demise of the European Le Mans Series would not be the end of sportscar racing in Europe.  In 2003, the Automobile Club de l'Ouest announced their intentions to create their own European-based series, named the Le Mans Endurance Series, which would be similar to the European Le Mans Series, but feature only 1000 km races instead of the shorter, 2 Hour 45 Minute races used by ELMS. This series would be far more successful, with a large number of participants from the very beginning.

APLMS
At the same time in the development of the European Le Mans Series, Don Panoz also proposed the idea of yet another series.  Originally named the Asian Le Mans Series, it was later known as the Asian-Pacific Le Mans Series (APLMS).  Like the European Le Mans Series, this APLMS would bring an ACO-backed sportscar series to Asia and the Pacific.  This could be seen as a resurrection of the All Japan Sports Prototype Championship (JSPC) which had ended in 1992.  The ACO had previous backed a single Japanese event, the 1999 Le Mans Fuji 1000km which combined Le Mans cars with JGTC machines for automatic entries to the 2000 24 Hours of Le Mans.  This idea was followed by the American Le Mans Series with the 2000 Race of a Thousand Years race at the Adelaide Street Circuit in Australia. These two events served as a precursor to the planned APLMS series, and at the time of the creation of ELMS, Don Panoz announced his intention to hold an exhibition APLMS race at Sepang International Circuit in Malaysia in late 2001.

As the ELMS season went on, it became apparent that there was a lack of interest in the series, and Don Panoz decided that the APLMS would likely have even less interest. Thus the APLMS exhibition race and all plans for a series were scrapped.

Schedule
Besides Sebring, Estoril, and Petit Le Mans, all events were 2 hours and 45 minutes in length.

† - Joint event with ALMS.

Season results

Overall winner in bold.

Teams' Championship

Points are awarded to the finishers in the following order:
 25-21-19-17-15-14-13-12-11-10-...
Exception being for 12 Hours of Sebring, 1000 km of Estoril, and Petit Le Mans which awarded in the following order:
 30-26-24-22-20-19-18-17-16-15-...

Points were awarded in two separate ways. Only the best finish out of the two American rounds (1 and 7) was included. In addition to this, only the top five finishes for the entire season were included. Points earned but not counting towards the team's total are listed in italics.

Teams only score the points of their highest finishing entry in each race. Teams which participated at Sebring and Petit Le Mans but did not attend any European events are also not counted towards the ELMS championships.

LMP900 standings

LMP675 standings

GTS standings

GT standings

References

External links
 IMSA European Le Mans Series 2001

European Le Mans Series
 
European Le Mans Series seasons
European Le Mans Series